Alberto Berasategui was the defending champion, but did not participate this year.

Slava Doseděl won the title, defeating Marcelo Ríos 7–6(7–3), 6–3 in the final.

Seeds

Draw

Finals

Top half

Bottom half

External links
 Singles draw

Singles